Garmab-e Olya (also Romanized as Garmāb-e ‘Olyā; also known as Garmāb-e Bālā) is a village in Alan Rural District, in the Central District of Sardasht County, West Azerbaijan Province, Iran. At the 2006 census, its population was 13, in 5 families.

References 

Populated places in Sardasht County